Michael Ehregott Grose   (1747 – 24 September 1795) was a Danish organist and composer. Notable works include Samling af lette Harpe, Claveer og Syngestykker for Liebhavere og Begyndere (1791)
and Morgenen (1793).

See also
List of Danish composers

References
This article was initially translated from the Danish Wikipedia.

External links
 

Danish classical organists
Male classical organists
Danish composers
Male composers
1747 births
1795 deaths
18th-century composers
18th-century male musicians
18th-century musicians
18th-century keyboardists